Bad Taste is an album by The Killer Barbies. It was released in 2000 on Drakkar Records.

Track listing
 "Lost Control" (4.01)
 "Love Killer" (2.39)
 "Freakshow" (4.20)
 "Crazy" (3.53)
 "Mars" (2.43)
 "Going Down" (3.40)
 "The Family is Chainsaw" (2.44)
 "Comic Books" (2.43)
 "Rage" (2.16)
 "Hurt Me" (3.14)
 "I Can Hide" (2.11)
 "Baby with Two Heads" (3.24)
 "No Waves" (2.28)
 "Set on Fire" (Japanese bonus track) (2.29)
All songs composed by S. Garcia, except #13 by A. Dominguez
All lyrics by A. Dominguez
Recorded at Principal Studios-Senden, September – November 1999. Produced by Ralf Quick.

Personnel 
 Silivia Superstar – vocals
 Billy King – drums
 Doctor Muerte – guitar
 Jeyper Man – bass

The Killer Barbies albums
2000 albums